Crime Over London is a 1936 British crime film directed by Alfred Zeisler and starring Margot Grahame, Paul Cavanagh and David Burns. It was made at Isleworth Studios, based on the novel House of a Thousand Windows by Ludwig von Wohl. The film's sets were designed by art director Edward Carrick.

Plot
With the police on their tail, a gang of New York criminals decided to relocate to London where they plan a major robbery on a department store.

Main cast
 Margot Grahame as Pearl - Gang-Moll 
 Paul Cavanagh as Inspector Gary  
 David Burns as Sniffy  
 Joseph Cawthorn as Mr. Sherwood / Reilly 
 Basil Sydney as 'Joker' Finnigan  
 Rene Ray as Joan  
 Bruce Lester as Ronald Martin 
 Edmon Ryan as Spider 
 John Darrow as Jim  
 Danny Green as Klemm  
 Googie Withers as Miss Dupres 
 Roland Culver as Soap Salesman 
 Torin Thatcher as Mr. Finley

References

Bibliography
 Low, Rachael. Filmmaking in 1930s Britain. George Allen & Unwin, 1985.
 Wood, Linda. British Films, 1927-1939. British Film Institute, 1986.

External links

1936 films
1936 crime films
British crime films
1930s English-language films
Films set in London
Films directed by Alfred Zeisler
Films shot at Isleworth Studios
Films based on British novels
British black-and-white films
Films scored by Percival Mackey
1930s British films